Calocoris affinis is a species of insect in the subfamily Mirinae of the family Miridae that can be found everywhere in Europe except for Switzerland and Greece.

Distribution 

It is distributed in most of Europe, including Denmark, Germany, Turkey, Serbia, Finland, Spain, Portugal and Italy. It is normally found in meadows.

It is not found in Switzerland and Greece due to the mountainous terrain.

Characteristics 
It can be 6.6 to 8.3 mm long. It lays its eggs in the fall, while hatching in the summer from June to August.

Diet 
Its diet consists of Urtica dioica juices, Heracleum sphondylium nectar, and Centaurea jacea nectar.

References

External links 
Calocoris affinis on YouTube

Mirini
Hemiptera of Europe
Insects described in 1835
Taxa named by Gottlieb August Wilhelm Herrich-Schäffer